Stroitel Baku (formerly named Temp Baku) was a Soviet association football club from Baku, Azerbaijan SSR. They played in the Soviet Top League for only one season, 1938, before relegation to the Soviet First League. They dissolved two years later at the end of the 1940 season.

Honours
Soviet First League
Runners–up (1): 1936 (autumn)
Soviet Second League
Runners–up (1): 1936 (spring)
Soviet Cup
Quarter-finalist (1): 1939

References 

Football clubs in Baku
Association football clubs established in 1930
1930 establishments in Azerbaijan
Soviet Top League clubs